A pot glass is a kind of glassware used for drinking beer in Australia. The size of a pot glass is 285mL (approximately 1⁄2 Imperial Pint).  In Queensland, a pot is the most common size of drinking vessel for beer, and is the default glass for beer served at pubs and bars.

Within various states of Australia, a 285mL glass is also known as a middy, or in South Australia as a schooner, however, anywhere else in Australia, a schooner is considered a 425mL glass.

See also
 Australian beer#Beer glasses.
 Australian English vocabulary#Beer glasses

External links
 http://www.sceneandheard.ca/article.php?id=55  Which Size Beer Do Ya Want, Mate? Ordering a Beer in Australia is a perplexing endeavour By Jess Zalameda

Beer glassware